is a Japanese politician and a former President of the Liberal Democratic Party. He served as Speaker of the House of Representatives from November 2003 until August 2009, when the LDP lost its majority in the 2009 election. Kōno served as speaker for the longest length since the set up of House of Representatives in 1890.

He was the president of the Japan Association of Athletics Federations from 1999 to 2013.

Early life and education 
Kōno was born on 15 January 1937, in Hiratsuka, Kanagawa, the eldest son of politician Ichirō Kōno. His father served as deputy prime minister and was in charge of the 1964 Tokyo Olympics. His younger uncle Kenzō Kōno served as the president of the House of Councillors from 1971 to 1977.

After graduating from Waseda University Senior High School, he studied Economics at Waseda University. Upon graduation, Kōno worked with the Marubeni company. In 1967, Kono's political career began due to the death of his father.

Political career 

He was Deputy Prime Minister of Japan from 1994 to 1995 which he had strong influence in the Murayama Cabinet. He was Minister of Foreign Affairs under Prime Minister Tomiichi Murayama and Yoshirō Mori (1993-1995, 1999-2001). He is a member of the Liberal Democratic Party (LDP). He was once President of the LDP from 1993 to 1995, and to date is one of two LDP leaders, along with Sadakazu Tanigaki, to have never served as Prime Minister of Japan. As he is one of the pro-China faction of the LDP, he came under pressure domestically in the spring of 2005 when anti-Japanese movements in China became intense due to then Prime Minister Junichiro Koizumi visited the Yasukuni Shrine which he opposed the visit to.

Kōno is known for his acknowledgement of comfort women. During his tenure as Chief Cabinet Secretary, in a speech titled the official statement he made in 1993, made after historian Yoshiaki Yoshimi announced he had discovered in the Defense Agency library in Tokyo documentary evidence that the Imperial Japanese Army established and ran comfort stations, he admitted that the Japanese Imperial Army had been involved, directly and indirectly, in the establishment of comfort stations, and that coercion had been used in the recruitment and retention of the women. His subsequent call for historical research and education aimed at remembering the issue became the basis for addressing the subject of forced prostitution in school history textbooks.

Footnotes 

|-

|-

|-

|-

|-

|-

|-

|-

|-

|-

1937 births
Living people
People from Hiratsuka, Kanagawa
Waseda University alumni
Speakers of the House of Representatives (Japan)
Members of the House of Representatives (Japan)
Deputy Prime Ministers of Japan
Government ministers of Japan
Foreign ministers of Japan
Japanese racehorse owners and breeders
Liver transplant recipients
Liberal Democratic Party (Japan) politicians
New Liberal Club politicians
21st-century Japanese politicians
Politicians from Kanagawa Prefecture